The Cotswold Air Show, formerly known as; and still referred to by some people as the Kemble Air Show, is an airshow held every year at Cotswold Airport in Gloucestershire. Attendance has grown steadily, with the 2008 event hosting nearly twenty thousand visitors. This rise in visitors led to the rebranding of the event in 2009, which included the show being extended in length from one day to two, held on the weekend of 20 June.

The event is one of three annual air shows that take place at Cotswold Airport, on which construction began in 1936, along with the Great Vintage Flying Weekend in May and the Battle of Britain Airshow in September. The two other events are held towards the northern edge of the airport, whilst the Cotswold Air Show is held towards the southern edge of the site, allowing for a much larger showground.

The Red Arrows, the aerobatics display team of the Royal Air Force, were initially based at the aerodrome, and the airport is known as the team's "spiritual home". Because of this heritage, the event is one of the few airshows in the United Kingdom that receives special support from the Royal Air Force, as a 'Priority 1' event.

Unlike many other air shows, where the flying displays continue uninterrupted, the flying displays at the Cotswold Air Show are stopped in the middle of the day for a lunch break. The event has become well known among aviation enthusiasts for flypasts of aircraft in unusual formations, which have become known as "Kemble Moments".

In 2009, aircraft belonging to the US Air Force appeared for the first time at the event. The year also saw the debut of the restored Vulcan bomber, a project that cost over £6m over 15 years. In 2010, the event commemorated the 70th anniversary of the Battle of Britain, featuring aircraft including the Supermarine Spitfire and the Hawker Hurricane. The event was held to raise money for the Royal Air Force Benevolent Fund.

2010 also featured a display named 'O'Brien's Flying Circus', which on the second display was not carried out successfully. The pilot of a light aircraft was meant to land on a trailer, but because of crosswinds, after multiple attempts they were unable to do and made a conventional landing on the runway. The event also featured aircraft from the Battle of Britain, featuring pyrotechnics and audio effects.

References

External links

 Cotswold Air Show official web site

Airshows in the United Kingdom
Culture in Gloucestershire
Annual events in England
Events in Gloucestershire